Charles Crisp may refer to:
Sir Charles Crisp, 5th Baronet, Member of Parliament for Woodstock
Charles Frederick Crisp (1845–1896), US Congressman from Georgia
Charles R. Crisp (1870–1937), US Representative from Georgia, son of Charles Frederick Crisp